The Austrian Society for Railway History ( or ÖGEG) is an Austrian society that was formed from a group of railway fans, who got together around 1971 in order to look after working steam locomotives at the Austrian Federal Railway (ÖBB) depot of Linz.

History

The society was founded in 1974 in Linz, with the aim of taking into its ownership one of the steam locomotives that it had cared for, as well as preserving the closed railway line, the Florianerbahn, as a heritage railway. In the following years the ÖGEG acquired several retired ÖBB locomotives. The first one to run again under its own power on ÖBB lines was locomotive ÖBB 93.1455 in 1978. In succeeding years other locomotives were refurbished in the rented ÖBB boiler house at Amstetten, and several were presented to large numbers of the public in 1987 at the 150th anniversary of the railways in Austria at vehicle parades in Strasshof an der Nordbahn and at vehicle shows.

In the 1980s the ÖGEG procured a Class 142 locomotive in Romania. This class was a 214 or 12 built under licence in Romania, the largest and most powerful steam locomotive of Austrian design. It was back in service by 1993. After the collapse of the Iron Curtain, numerous well-preserved German locomotives could be bought, particularly from Romania, but also in the former German Democratic Republic. As a result the society was criticised because funding was used to buy several German locomotives without any connexion to the railway history of Austria. These engines were however used commercially for special services with great success. On the retirement of older locomotives from the ÖBB in the early 1990s the ÖGEG also obtained many electric and diesel traction units.

ÖGEG's historical railway vehicles are in service today on the ÖBB railway network, on Austrian private railways and also abroad.

The Florianerbahn has since been hived off from the ÖGEG and transferred into a separate company.

The ÖGEG has two of its own lines today. It was closed in 1982, and reopened in 1985 as a museum railway. The Steyrtalbahn has eight steam locomotives in its operating fleet.

In 1995 the first specials were run on the former coal railway of the WTK (Wolfsegg Traunthaler) from Timelkam to Ampflwang. After that the Ampflwanger Bahn was taken over and is today the ÖGEG standard gauge museum line, ferrying visitors to the railway museum at Ampflwang.

In 1995 the ÖGEG also acquired the last steam passenger ship of the Austrian Danube shipping fleet, the Schönbrunn.

Ampflwang Railway Museum

The railway museum in Ampflwang im Hausruckwald houses the society’s extensive steam loco collection. It is located in a former WTK coal and steel works at the terminus of the former coal railway. In 2005 the Ampflwang railway museum acquired the turntable of the former Bahnbetriebswerk at Rosenheim as well as the traverser from the former SGP factory at Vienna-Simmering. In addition a new roundhouse was built around the turntable. The railway museum was the venue for the Upper Austrian State Exhibition (Oberösterreichische Landesausstellung) in 2006 under the motto Kohle und Dampf (coal and steam).

Vehicles (partial list)

Steam locomotives
01.533 (DR Class 01.5 East German express locomotive, rebuilt in 1964 from 1934-built DRG Class 01 number 01 116, (Einheitsdampflokomotive), standard gauge)
"12.14" (BBÖ 214 series tender express locomotive built under licence in Romania as CFR 142.063, standard gauge)
638.1301 (Prussian P 8 = ÖBB 638, standard gauge)
638.2174 (Prussian P 8 = ÖBB 638, standard gauge)
42.2750 (DRB Class 42 German war locomotive (Kriegslok),standard gauge)
42.2753 (DRB Class 42 German war locomotive (Kriegslok),standard gauge)
44.661 (DRG Class 44 German heavy goods train steam locomotive (Einheitsdampflokomotive), standard gauge)
44.1614 (DRG Class 44 German heavy goods train steam locomotive (Einheitsdampflokomotive), standard gauge)
50.1002 (DRB Class 50 German 2-10-0 goods locomotive, built from 1939, (Einheitsdampflokomotive), standard gauge)
50.3506 (DRB Class 50 German 2-10-0 goods locomotive, built from 1939, (Einheitsdampflokomotive), standard gauge)
50.3519 (DRB Class 50 German 2-10-0 goods locomotive, built from 1939, (Einheitsdampflokomotive), standard gauge)
50.3689 (DRB Class 50 German 2-10-0 goods locomotive, built from 1939, (Einheitsdampflokomotive), standard gauge)
52.1198 (DRB Class 52 German war locomotive (Kriegslok),standard gauge)
52.3316 (DRB Class 52 German war locomotive (Kriegslok),standard gauge)
52.3517 (DRB Class 52 German war locomotive (Kriegslok),standard gauge)
52.4552 (DRB Class 52 German war locomotive (Kriegslok),standard gauge)
52.7102 (DRB Class 52 German war locomotive (Kriegslok),standard gauge)
52.8096 (DRB Class 52 German war locomotive (Kriegslok),standard gauge)
52.8124 (DRB Class 52 German war locomotive (Kriegslok),standard gauge)
52.8186 (DRB Class 52 German war locomotive (Kriegslok),standard gauge)
52.8196 (DRB Class 52 German war locomotive (Kriegslok),standard gauge)
657.2519 (Prussian G 10 = ÖBB Class 657, standard gauge)
657.2770 (Prussian G 10 = ÖBB Class 657, standard gauge)
657.3459 (Prussian G 10 = ÖBB Class 657, standard gauge)
77.28 (BBÖ 629, ex-Südbahn 629, later ÖBB 77 series, standard gauge)
78.618  (BBÖ 729 series, later ÖBB 78 series, standard gauge)
86.056 (DRG Class 86 German tank locomotive, standard gauge)
86.501 (DRG Class 86 German tank locomotive, standard gauge)
93.1326 (BBÖ 378 standard gauge)
93.1394 (BBÖ 378 standard gauge)
93.1455 (BBÖ 378 standard gauge)
392.2530 (BBÖ 478 standard gauge)
298.102 (Steyrtalbahn 2, narrow gauge, oldest preserved and working narrow gauge locomotive in Austria, 760 mm)
298.106 (Steyrtalbahn 6, narrow gauge)
298.52 (kkStB U series, ex NÖLB U.2, narrow gauge)
298.53 (kkStB U series, ex NÖLB U.3, narrow gauge)
498.04 (BBÖ Uh series, narrow gauge)
399.005 (NÖLB Mh series, ex NÖLB Mh.5, arrow gauge)
699.103 (HF 160 D series, narrow gauge)

Diesel locomotives
2050.05 (standard gauge)
2045.012 (standard gauge)

Diesel railbus
5046.214 (standard gauge)

Electric locomotives
1010.09  (standard gauge)
1018.002 (standard gauge)
1110.522 (standard gauge)
1110.526 (standard gauge)
1141.21  (standard gauge)

Ships
Steamship Schönbrunn
Motor vessel Traisen

External links
Home page 
Complete list of steam locos at the Austrian steam base
ÖGEG

Railway museums in Austria
Locomotives of Austria
Museums in Upper Austria